The Commitment March: Get Your Knee Off Our Necks was an event held in Washington, D.C., on August 28, 2020. The march was organized by the National Action Network, and was led by Al Sharpton and Martin Luther King III. The march's speakers included relatives of George Floyd, Breonna Taylor, Jacob Blake, among others. Democratic vice-presidential nominee Kamala Harris spoke virtually.

See also

2020–2021 United States racial unrest

References

External links
 

2020 in Washington, D.C.
August 2020 events in the United States
Protests in Washington, D.C.
Shooting of Jacob Blake